The 1953–54 season was Aberdeen's 41st season in the top flight of Scottish football and their 43rd season overall. Aberdeen competed in the Scottish League Division One, Scottish League Cup, and the Scottish Cup.

Results

Division A

Final standings

Scottish League Cup

Group 2

Group 2 final table

Scottish Cup

References

AFC Heritage Trust

Aberdeen F.C. seasons
Aber